Bewaffa Se Waffa (lit: Loyalty to the disloyal) is a 1992 Hindi film starring Juhi Chawla , Nagma and Vivek Mushran  in lead roles directed and produced by Saawan Kumar Tak. The film was released on 4 September 1992.

Plot
Aslam (Vivek Mushran) marries Rukshar (Juhi Chawla). Their marriage problems start with the discovery of Rukhsar's inability to give birth to a child. Due to this, she asks for help from Nagma and she requests her to marry Aslam for a kid. After the marriage, Nagma's maternal uncle Ajgar Khan and Maternal Aunt conspire, due to which the misunderstandings between Aslam and Rukhsar get widened. Later, after many ups and downs the movie proceeds to an end.

Cast
Vivek Mushran as Aslam
Juhi Chawla as Rukshar
Nagma as Naghma 
Prem Chopra as Ajgar Khan
Pran as Nawab Jamaluddin Khan 
Mehmood as Khabre
Aruna Irani as Razia 
Goga Kapoor as Dervesh 
Lalit Tiwari as Altaf Ahmed  
Master Manish as Munna

Soundtrack
Saawan Kumar Tak wrote all the songs.

References

External links
 
 

1992 films
1990s Hindi-language films
Films scored by Usha Khanna
Indian drama films
Films with screenplays by Sachin Bhowmick
Films directed by Saawan Kumar Tak
Hindi-language drama films